Wubu may refer to:

Wubu County, in Yulin, Shaanxi, China 
WUBU, a radio station licensed to South Bend, Indiana, United States
 Wūbù (巫步), "shaman's steps," a form of Taoist dance. See yubu.